Gazos Creek is a stream in San Mateo County, California, in the United States.

Gazos was likely derived from the Spanish word garzas meaning "herons".

See also
List of rivers of California

References

Rivers of San Mateo County, California